Gravity X is the debut studio album by Swedish rock band Truckfighters, released on 12 July 2005 by Fuzzorama Records. The album was reissued alongside their subsequent album, Phi, in a compilation LP release in June 2013.

Track listing
All tracks written by Truckfighters, except for "A. Zapruder" written by Truckfighters and Anders Jacobson.

Critical reception
AllMusic reviewed Gravity X, giving it 3.5 stars.

Personnel

Truckfighters
Ozo - bass, vocals
Fredo - guitar
Dango - guitar
Paco - drums (tracks 1-4, 6-10)
Pezo - drums (tracks 5, 11, 13)

Additional musicians
Anders Jacobson - drums (track 12)
Andreas Alm - trumpet
Petter Fridell - trombone

References

2005 albums
Truckfighters albums